Mamluk-Kipchak language was a Kipchak language that was spoken in Egypt and Syria during the Mamluk Sultanate period. Since most of the Mamluk rulers were monolingual Turkic speakers, several dictionaries were complied to enable communication between Arabic speaking population of the empire and its rulers. The language was also used as literary language and several Arabic and Persian works have been translated to Kipchak by Mamluks. It was written in Arabic script. Mamluk-Kipchak lost its ground as the dominant Turkic language to Oghuz Turkic among the ruling Burji dynasty.

References 

Agglutinative languages
Extinct languages of Asia
Extinct languages of Africa
Kipchak languages
Medieval languages
Turkic languages